Rapeepan Pulsawat(Thai ระพีพันธุ์ พูลสวัสดิ์ ) is a Thai footballer. He plays for Thai League 4 clubside Nonthaburi.

References

1982 births
Living people
Rapeepan Pulsawat
Association football defenders
Rapeepan Pulsawat
Rapeepan Pulsawat
Rapeepan Pulsawat
Rapeepan Pulsawat
Rapeepan Pulsawat
Rapeepan Pulsawat